The pantheism controversy, also known as Spinozismusstreit or Spinozastreit, refers to the 1780s debates in German intellectual life that discussed the merits of Spinoza's "pantheistic" conception of God. What became a wider cultural debate in German society started as a personal disagreement between Friedrich Heinrich Jacobi and Moses Mendelssohn over their understanding of Gotthold Ephraim Lessing's Spinozist beliefs. The difference of opinion became a wider public controversy when, in 1785, Jacobi published his correspondence with Mendelssohn. This started a series of public discussions on the matter.

Benjamin Crowe of Boston University stated in a 2008 paper that: "The leading luminaries of late eighteenth and early-nineteenth German letters, people such as Herder, Goethe, Hegel, Schelling and Schleiermacher, all, in one way or another, were shaped by the ‘Pantheism Controversy’." And in Michael Forster's own words (2010), "During the last quarter or so of the eighteenth century and then well into the nineteenth century a wave of neo-Spinozism swept through German philosophy and literature: in addition to Lessing and Herder, further neo-Spinozists included Goethe, Schelling, Hegel, Schleiermacher, Hölderlin, Novalis, and Friedrich Schlegel. This wave was largely a result of Herder's embrace of neo-Spinozism in God: Some Conversations (and in Goethe's case, Herder's sympathy with Spinozism even before that work)."

History
A conversation between the German philosopher Friedrich Heinrich Jacobi and the German dramatist Gotthold Ephraim Lessing in 1780 led Jacobi to a protracted study of Baruch Spinoza's works. Lessing had avowed that he knew no philosophy, in the true sense of that word, save Spinozism.

Jacobi's Über die Lehre des Spinozas (1st ed. 1785, 2nd ed. 1789) expressed sharply and clearly his strenuous objection to a dogmatic system in philosophy, and drew upon him the vigorous enmity of the Berlin group, led by Moses Mendelssohn. Jacobi claimed that Spinoza's doctrine was pure materialism, because all Nature and God are said to be nothing but extended substance. This, for Jacobi, was the result of Enlightenment rationalism and it would finally end in absolute atheism. Mendelssohn disagreed with Jacobi, saying that there is no actual difference between theism and pantheism. The entire issue became a major intellectual and religious concern for European civilization at the time, which Immanuel Kant rejected, as he thought that attempts to conceive of transcendent reality would lead to antinomies in thought.

Legacy

Jacobi was ridiculed for trying to reintroduce into philosophy the antiquated notion of unreasoning belief, was denounced as an enemy of reason, as a pietist, and as a Jesuit in disguise, and was especially attacked for his use of the ambiguous term Glaube (German: "belief, faith"). 

Willi Goetschel argues that Jacobi's publication significantly shaped the reception of Spinoza's doctrine for centuries following its publication, obscuring the nuance of Spinoza's philosophic work.

The Pantheism controversy is also notable for its development of and influence upon prominent philosophical terms in German culture, including the idea of nihilism and claims that God is dead.

Jacobi's next important work, David Hume Über den Glauben, oder Idealismus und Realismus (1787), was an attempt to show not only that the term Glaube had been used by the most eminent writers to denote what he had employed it for in the Letters on Spinoza, but that the nature of the cognition of facts as opposed to the construction of inferences could not be otherwise expressed. In this writing, and especially in the appendix, Jacobi came into contact with the critical philosophy, and subjected the Kantian view of knowledge to searching examination.

The attraction of Spinoza's philosophy to late eighteenth-century Europeans was that it provided an alternative to materialism, atheism, and deism. Three of Spinoza's ideas strongly appealed to them: the unity of all that exists, the regularity of all that happens, and the identity of spirit and nature.

At the dawn of the first remarkable Spinoza revival in history, the break of the Pantheismusstreit marked the moment in which Baruch Spinoza's radical thinking moved from the clandestine underground to the center of the public debate and Spinoza's impact on Western thinking became public.

In the eighteenth and nineteenth centuries, Spinoza's thought was a vital force in the development of German philosophy and culture in general. From the age of Leibniz–Wolff to Lessing–Mendelssohn–Jacobi–Herder to Fichte–Schleiermacher–Hegel–Schelling to Feuerbach–Hess–Marx–Engels to Nietzsche to Haeckel, Spinoza's philosophy was especially both an immense source of inspiration and challenge for almost every major German thinker, including both the idealists and materialists. Spinoza's influence on German literary luminaries, particularly the Romantics, was highly significant from the age of Lessing to Goethe–Hölderlin–Novalis–Schlegel–Heine.

See also 
 Atheism dispute
 Spinozism

References 

German idealism
1780s in the Holy Roman Empire
History of philosophy
controversy
Neo-Spinozism
Spinoza studies
Philosophical debates